The 2018 Ukrainian Super Cup became the 15th edition of Ukrainian Super Cup, an annual season opener football match contested by the winners of the previous season's Ukrainian Top League and Ukrainian Cup competitions.

The match was played at the Chornomorets Stadium, Odessa, on 21 July 2018, and contested by league and cup winner Shakhtar Donetsk and league and cup runner-up Dynamo Kyiv.

Previous encounters 

Before this game, both teams met in the Ukrainian Super Cup ten (10) times, the first being back in 2004. Out of the previous ten before this game, Shakhtar won 3 games and Dynamo won 2. Five more games were tied and led to penalty shootout, three of which were won by Dynamo and two were won by Shakhtar.

Match

Details

Statistics

References

External links
 "Choose your color": everyone to the Ukrainian Super Cup! («Обери свій колір»: усі на Суперкубок України!). Ukrainian Premier League. 5 June 2018

2018
2018–19 in Ukrainian football
FC Dynamo Kyiv matches
FC Shakhtar Donetsk matches
Sport in Odesa